The Hordern Mystery is a 1920 Australian film directed by Harry Southwell based on an 1889 novel by Edmund Finn (son of Edmund Finn). Unlike many Australian silent films, it still survives today.

Plot
Money-hungry Gilbert Hordern is married to an adoring wife and has a child. He pretends to be his own evil twin brother so he can marry a millionaire's daughter. He succeeds but is wracked with guilt and confesses. He wakes up and realises it was all a dream.

Cast
Claude Turton as Gilbert Hordern
Flo Little as Midge Hordern
Floris St George as Laura Yellaboyce
Godfrey Cass as Dan Yellaboyce
Thomas Sinclair as Peter Mull
Beatrice Hamilton as Mrs Mull
David Edelsten

Production
The film was shot in suburban Sydney in mid 1920 under the title The Golden Flame. Commercial reception appears to have been poor.

References

External links
 
The Hordern Mystery at National Film and Sound Archive

1920 films
Australian black-and-white films
Australian silent feature films
Films directed by Harry Southwell